Senin is a surname. Notable people with the surname include:

Adrian Senin (born 1979), Romanian footballer
Agustín Senin (born 1946), Spanish boxer
Ivan Senin (1903–1981), Ukrainian Soviet politician
Vladimir Senin (born 1960), Russian politician

See also
Senin Sebai (born 1993), Ivorian footballer